is a professional Japanese baseball player. He plays pitcher for the Orix Buffaloes.

References 

1991 births
Living people
Baseball people from Osaka Prefecture
Osaka University of Commerce alumni
Nippon Professional Baseball pitchers
Orix Buffaloes players
People from Sakai, Osaka